Charles Henry Hand (21 November 1900 – 3 October 1966) was an Australian politician.

He was born in Hong Kong. In 1948 he was elected to the Tasmanian House of Assembly as a Labor member for Franklin. He held the seat until his defeat in 1956. Hand died in 1966 in Hobart.

References

1900 births
1966 deaths
Members of the Tasmanian House of Assembly
Hong Kong emigrants to Australia
Australian Labor Party members of the Parliament of Tasmania
20th-century Australian politicians